Celso Battaia (1 February 1920 – 5 February 2007) was an Italian footballer who played for Inter Milan, AC Milan and Cremonese. After retiring from football he became a professional photographer.

References

1920 births
2007 deaths
Italian footballers
Inter Milan players
A.C. Milan players
U.S. Cremonese players
Association football midfielders